Antonela is Croatian a feminine given name that is a diminutive form of Antonia and an alternate form of Antonella used in Croatia. Notable people with this name include the following:

Antonela Anić (born 1985), Croatian basketball player
Antonela Curatola (born 1991), Argentine volleyball player
Antonela Đinđić, known Nela, Croatian singer and songwriter
Antonela Ferenčić (born 1994), Croatian racing cyclist
Antonela Fortuna (born 1995), Argentine volleyball player
Antonela Mena (born 1988), Argentine handball player
Antonela Radeljić (born 1996), Bosnian footballer

See also

Antonella
Antoneta Papapavli

Notes

Croatian feminine given names